

Hans-Ferdinand Geisler (19 April 1891 – 25 June 1966) was a German general during World War II.

Military career 
Born in Hanover in April 1891, Geisler joined the Imperial German Navy on April 1, 1909 as a Seekadett, prior to World War I and served during the entire conflict. He joined the newly formed Luftwaffe in September 1933, reaching the rank of General der Flieger in July 1940. As commander of Fliegerkorps X from October 2, 1939 to August 31, 1942, he used his background as a sailor to specialise in anti-shipping aerial operations. He was awarded the Knight's Cross of the Iron Cross on 4 May 1940. He retired in October 1942 and died in June 1966 in Freiburg im Breisgau.

Promotions 
April 12, 1910, Fähnrich zur See
September 19, 1912, Leutnant zur See
May 2, 1915, Oberleutnant zur See
January 21, 1920, Kapitänleutnant
January 1, 1928, Korvettenkapitän
January 1, 1933, Fregattenkapitän
September 1, 1934, Oberst
April 1, 1937, Major General
April 1, 1939, Lieutenant General
July 19, 1940, General der Flieger

References 

 Patrick, Facon (2009). Malte, 1940-1943: Comment Rommel fut vaincu. Le Fana de l'Aviation Hors-Série n°42
 

1891 births
1966 deaths
Luftwaffe World War II generals
Military personnel from Hanover
Recipients of the Gold German Cross
Recipients of the Knight's Cross of the Iron Cross
Reichsmarine personnel
German World War I pilots

Imperial German Navy personnel of World War I
People from the Province of Hanover
Generals of Aviators
20th-century Freikorps personnel